Sewa River is a river in Sierra Leone. Its furthest sources are the Bagbe River and Bafi River, which originates in the mountainous areas of the northeastern part of the country, near the border with Guinea. Close to the Atlantic coast the river joins Waanje River to form the Kittam River. Kittam River flows  westwards along the coast and enters a network of lagoons and streams separated from the sea by Turner's Peninsula. By the island of Sherbro, Kittam empties into the larger estuary Sherbro River.

Sewa River is navigable over shorter distances, but in the middle and upper reaches, rapids and cataracts dominate.

The river has great commercial value for Sierra Leone. Sewa's upper reaches is being panned for diamonds on a large scale. Closer to the coast rice cultivation and the cultivation of piassava, exported for the production of besoms, are important crops.

References

Rivers of Sierra Leone